The 1946 Toledo Rockets football team was an American football team that represented Toledo University as a member of the Ohio Athletic Conference (OAC) during the 1946 college football season. In their first season under head coach Bill Orwig, the Rockets compiled a 6–2–2 record, outscored their opponents by a combined total of 200 to 132, and defeated Bates, 21–12, in the first postseason Glass Bowl game.

The 1946 season was the first for the Toledo Rockets since 1942. In 1946, the University of Toledo rebuilt University Stadium using glass blocks throughout the stadium, installing lights for night games and a glass electric scoreboard, and building a two-level press box out of blue vitrolite and glass blocks. The renovated stadium was named the Glass Bowl with the dedication game being played on December 7, 1946, against Bates.  The Toledo team captain in 1946 was Bill Gall.

Schedule

References

Toledo
Toledo Rockets football seasons
Toledo Rockets football